First elections in Sindh, as part of Pakistan, for the Sindh Legislative Assembly, were held in May 1953. The elections were held for 111 seats, Sindh Muslim League fielded 92 candidates, Sindh Muslim League of M.A. Khuhro fielded 51 candidates and Sindh Awami Mahaz fielded 51 candidates for the election. Apart from candidates fielded by Political parties, 137 Muslims, 4 women and 43 minority candidates contested the elections.

List of members of the 4th Provincial Assembly of Sindh 
Tenure of the Assembly was from 12th September 1953 till 26th March 1955.

See Also 
 List of members of the 1st Provincial Assembly of Sindh
 List of members of the 2nd Provincial Assembly of Sindh
 List of members of the 3rd Provincial Assembly of Sindh

References 

Provincial Assembly of Sindh
Politics of Sindh